Photopic vision is the vision of the eye under well-lit conditions (luminance levels from 10 to 108 cd/m2). In humans and many other animals, photopic vision allows color perception, mediated by cone cells, and a significantly higher visual acuity and temporal resolution than available with scotopic vision.

The human eye uses three types of cones to sense light in three bands of color. The biological pigments of the cones have maximum absorption values at wavelengths of about 420 nm (blue), 534 nm (bluish-green), and 564 nm (yellowish-green). Their sensitivity ranges overlap to provide vision throughout the visible spectrum. The maximum efficacy is 683 lm/W at a wavelength of 555 nm (green). By definition, light at a frequency of  hertz  has a luminous efficacy of 683 lm/W.

The wavelengths for when a person is in photopic vary with the intensity of light. For the blue-green region (500 nm), 50% of the light reaches the image point of the retina.

Adaptation is much faster under photopic vision; it can occur in 5 minutes for photopic vision but it can take 30 minutes to transition from photopic to scotopic.

Most older adult humans lose photopic spatial contrast sensitivity.  Adults in their 70s require about three times more contrast to detect high spatial frequencies than adults in their 20s.

The human eye uses scotopic vision under low-light conditions (luminance level 10−6 to 10−3.5 cd/m2), and mesopic vision in intermediate conditions (luminance level 10−3 to 100.5 cd/m2).

See also
 Adaptation (eye)
 Candela
 Cone cell
 Contrast (vision)
 Mesopic vision
 Night vision
 Purkinje effect
 Photometry (optics)
 Photosensitive ganglion cell
 Scotopic vision

References

Eye
Vision
Color vision